The 2013–14 Gamma Ethniki Cup was the first edition of the Gamma Ethniki Cup, a Greek football Cup competition, wherein only the clubs of the Gamma Ethniki (the third tier of the Greek football league system) were allowed to participate. The Cup winner competed at the end of the season with the winner of the 2013–14 Amateurs' Cup for the 2014 Amateurs' Super Cup.

First round
In first round of the competition, the clubs in each group competed against each other in single matches (overtime and penalties applied) until one club was declared Group winner. The competing pairs were selected as a result of random drawing that took place on 2 September 2013. The match days of the First Round were set on 14/15/16 September 2013 for Match-Day 1, 13/14 October 2013 for Match-Day 2, 17/18 November 2013 for Match-Day 3 and 15 December 2013 for each Group Final.

Group 1

Matchday 1
 	

|}

Matchday 2
 	

|}

Matchday 3

 	

|}

Group 1 Final

 
|}
* Note: Digenis Lakkoma even if have been defeated, qualified to the quarter-finals, as favored in the draw between the groups' finalists.

Group 2

Matchday 1

|}

Matchday 2

|}

Matchday 3

 	

|}

Group 2 Final

 	
|}
* Note: Kozani even if have been defeated, qualified to the quarter-finals, as favored in the draw between the groups' finalists.

Group 3

Matchday 1

|}
A.O.Kymi advance to Match-day 2 on walkover.

Matchday 2

|}

Matchday 3

 	

|}

Group 3 Final

 	
|}

Group 4

Matchday 1

|}

Matchday 2

|}

Matchday 3

 	

|}

Group 4 Final

 	
|}

Group 5

Matchday 1

|}
Ionikos advance to Match-day 2 on walkover.

Matchday 2

|}

Matchday 3

 	

|}

Group 5 Final

 	
|}

Group 6

Matchday 1

|}
AEK Athens advance to Matchday 2 on walkover.

Matchday 2

|}

Matchday 3

 	

|}

Group 6 Final

 	
|}

Bracket

Quarter-finals
In the Second Round of the competition (Quarter-finals), the 6 Group winners and two Group finalists (selected randomly in a draw that took place on 19 December 2013) competed against each other in single knock-out matches at the home ground of the club favored by the draw. All matches were held on 29 December 2013.

Semi-finals
In the Third Round of the competition (Semi-finals), the four clubs advancing from the Quarter-finals competed in double knockout matches (away goals rule) and the two winners advanced to the final. The first Leg was held on 22 January 2014 and second Leg on 23 February 2014

First leg

Second leg

Final

External links
Football League 2 Cup

2014
2013–14 in Greek football